was a Japanese politician of the Liberal Democratic Party, a member of the House of Councillors in the Diet (national legislature). A native of Kaneyama, Yamagata and graduate of Waseda University, he served in the town assembly of Kaneyama from 1967. He then served as mayor of the town for seven terms from 1971 until 1998 when he was elected to the House of Councillors for the first time.

References

External links 
  in Japanese.

1940 births
2017 deaths
Members of the House of Councillors (Japan)
Liberal Democratic Party (Japan) politicians
People from Yamagata Prefecture
Waseda University alumni